The Amarillo version of the NWA North American Heavyweight Championship was a top singles title in the National Wrestling Alliance's Amarillo, Texas territory, Western States Sports. It lasted from 1957 until 1969, when it was replaced with the NWA Western States Heavyweight Championship.

Title history
 written after a date indicates the title change occurred no later than that date.

See also
National Wrestling Alliance

References

External links
Wrestling-Titles.com

National Wrestling Alliance championships
Heavyweight wrestling championships
North American professional wrestling championships
Professional wrestling in Texas
Western States Sports championships